The Chief of the Air Force is the head of aerial warfare operations and the administrative head of the Somali Air Force. They are under the Chief of Armed Forces and the Ministry of Defence. The current Chief of the Air Force is Brigadier General Mohamud Sheikh Ali.

Chiefs of the Air Force

Somali Republic and Somali Democratic Republic (1960–1994)

Transitional Government and Federal Republic of Somalia (2012–present)

References 

Air force chiefs of staff
Somalian military leaders